Social Error is a 1935 American crime film directed by Harry L. Fraser and starring David Sharpe, Gertrude Messinger and Monte Blue. It was re-released by Astor Pictures in 1948.

Main cast
 David Sharpe as Edward 'Eddie' Bentley, Jr.  
 Gertrude Messinger as June Merton  
 Monte Blue as Dean Carter  
 Lloyd Hughes as Attorney Johnson  
 Sheila Terry as Sonia  
 Fred 'Snowflake' Toones as Shadow 
 Fred Kohler Jr. as Jackson  
 Matty Fain as Louie  
 Joseph W. Girard as Edward Bentley, Sr. 
 Earl Dwire as  Mr. Merton

References

Bibliography
 Pitts, Michael R. Poverty Row Studios, 1929–1940: An Illustrated History of 55 Independent Film Companies, with a Filmography for Each. McFarland & Company, 2005.

External links
 

1935 films
1935 crime films
1930s English-language films
American crime films
Commodore Pictures films
Films directed by Harry L. Fraser
American black-and-white films
1930s American films